Salvatore Perugini (born 6 March 1978 in Benevento) is a former Italian rugby union player. He made his debut for the Italian national team in 2000 against Ireland. Perugini usually played at prop. He previously played for Italian club Calvisano and French side Stade Toulouse.
In April 2010 it was announced he would move to the newly formed Aironi for the 2010/2011 season. 
Perugini was selected to play for the Barbarians when they beat New Zealand in 2009.

External links
RBS 6 Nations profile

1978 births
Living people
Sportspeople from Benevento
Italian rugby union players
Rugby union props
Expatriate rugby union players in France
Italy international rugby union players
Zebre Parma players
Italian expatriate rugby union players
Italian expatriate sportspeople in France